Boyd Dunn is an American politician who serves on the Arizona Corporation Commission, first being elected in the 2016 election. Prior to serving in the Commission, Dunn served as the mayor of Chandler, Arizona from 2002 to 2011.

Dunn also served as a superior court judge.

During the campaign, Dunn expressed doubts on the existence of climate change.

During the 2020 election, the Arizona Supreme Court removed Dunn from the Republican primary, ending his bid for re-election after a campaign worker admitted to forging some of the signatures on his nominating petition.

See also
 2006 Chandler, Arizona mayoral election

References

External links
 Biography at Ballotpedia
 Official Website
 Campaign Site

Arizona Republicans
Living people
People from Chandler, Arizona
Year of birth missing (living people)
Mayors of places in Arizona